Judge J. W. F. Allen House, also known as "Ingleside," is a historic home located at Moorefield, Hardy County, West Virginia. It was built in 1842, and is a two-story brick dwelling in the Greek Revival style. It features eight foot high windows.  The interior features a semi-circular staircase.  A two-story rear addition was built in the 1960s.

It was listed on the National Register of Historic Places in 1983.

References

Houses on the National Register of Historic Places in West Virginia
Greek Revival houses in West Virginia
Houses completed in 1842
Houses in Hardy County, West Virginia
National Register of Historic Places in Hardy County, West Virginia
1842 establishments in Virginia